The 2000 Stockholm Open was an ATP men's tennis tournament played on hard courts, and held at the Kungliga tennishallen in Stockholm, Sweden. It was the 32nd edition of the event and part of the ATP International Series of the 2000 ATP Tour. The tournament was held from 20 November through 26 November  2000. Unseeded Thomas Johansson won the singles title.

Finals

Singles

 Thomas Johansson defeated  Yevgeny Kafelnikov, 6–2, 6–4, 6–4
 It was Johansson's 1st singles title of the year and the 4th of his career.

Doubles

 Mark Knowles /  Daniel Nestor defeated  Petr Pála /  Pavel Vízner, 6–3, 6–2

References

External links
 Official website
 ATP tournament profile
 ITF tournament edition details

Stockholm Open
Stockholm Open
 
2000 in Swedish tennis
November 2000 sports events in Europe
2000s in Stockholm